The 1951 Philadelphia municipal election, was held on tuesday November 8,, involved contests for mayor, district attorney, all seventeen city council seats, among other offices. Citywide, the Democrats took majorities of over 130,000 votes, continuing their success from the elections four years earlier. Richardson Dilworth, who had been elected district attorney in 1951, was elected mayor. Victor H. Blanc, a city councilman, was elected district attorney. The Democrats also kept fourteen of seventeen city council seats, losing one district seat while gaining another, and kept control of the other citywide offices. The election represented a further consolidation of control by the Democrats after their citywide victories of four years earlier.

Mayor

In the mayor's race, incumbent Democrat Joseph S. Clark Jr., who had earlier declared he would serve only one term, did not run for reelection. He instead ran for election to the United States Senate in 1956 and was successful, serving in the Senate for twelve years. For the open seat, Democrat Richardson Dilworth ran against Republican Thacher Longstreth.

After service in World War I and a law degree from Yale, Dilworth practiced law in Philadelphia. He and Clark were allies in the anti-corruption reform effort that had swept the city four years earlier. Dilworth had run for mayor unsuccessfully in 1947, with Clark as his campaign manager. In 1949, he was elected City Treasurer. He resigned that post to run for governor in 1950, but was defeated by Republican John S. Fine. Democratic party leaders had intended Dilworth to be their candidate for mayor again in 1951, but when Clark announced his candidacy, Dilworth agreed to run for district attorney instead. He won, taking just shy of 58% of the vote. In the primary election in May, Dilworth easily defeated his underfunded opponent, William A. Paschall, a local meat dealer.

The Republicans nominated Thacher Longstreth, a 35-year-old advertising executive who had never run for office before. He emerged the victor of a four-way primary contest over George P. Williams (the Republican leadership's preferred candidate), city magistrate James J. Clothier, and Oscar H. Newman, a deputy constable. Longstreth's campaign got off to a rocky start when he broke with the city Republican organization over their failure to elect his preferred candidate, John M. Pomeroy, as chairman of the Republican City Committee. Although he did receive a campaign visit and endorsement from President Dwight D. Eisenhower, Longstreth had little other assistance from the Republican party machine and ran as an "Independent Republican". Republicans still held an edge in voter registration in 1955, but their share of the electorate continued to decline over previous years.

The result was a landslide for Dilworth. In an election with higher than expected turnout, the Democrat took 59% of the vote, a slight increase over the party's tally from the mayoral contest of four years earlier. The Democrats carried 44 of the city's 52 wards. Longstreth conceded defeat early in the evening, and said that he hoped for "an administration that will be good for all people and the progress of our great city". The Philadelphia Inquirer described the result as "a ringing indorsement [sic] of the policies of Mayor Joseph S. Clark, Jr., whose Democratic administration was the key issue in the Fall ballot drive."

District Attorney

For the open office of district attorney, vacated by Dilworth when he ran for mayor, the Democrats nominated city councilman Victor H. Blanc against the Republicans' Wilhelm F. Knauer. Blanc, a veteran of both World Wars and former assistant district attorney, had been elected to city council in an at-large seat in 1951. During his time on the council, he was in charge of an investigation into corruption in construction at Philadelphia International Airport. Knauer, a state deputy attorney general, was a long-time Republican party leader. His wife, Virginia Knauer, would later be elected to city council. As in the mayor's race, the Democrats were victorious, and Blanc was elected. His vote totals led the Democratic ticket, exceeding even Dilworth's numbers.

City Council
Philadelphians elected a seventeen-member city council in 1955, with ten members representing districts of the city, and the remaining seven being elected at-large. For the at-large seats, each political party could nominate five candidates, and voters could only vote for five, with the result being that the majority party could only take five of the seven seats, leaving two for the minority party. The Democrats' citywide dominance continued into the city council races, as they retained control of nine of ten districts and five of seven at-large seats.

In the at-large races, the two incumbent Democratic candidates, Victor E. Moore and Paul D'Ortona, led the ticket. Three other Democrats were also elected: John F. Byrne Sr., who had previously been councilman for the 10th district; Henry W. Sawyer, a civil rights lawyer; and Marshall L. Shepard, a clergyman who had served as Commissioner of Records. On the Republican side, incumbent at-large councilman Louis Schwartz was re-elected. The other Republican incumbent, Donald C. Rubel, who had won a special election as an independent Republican backed by Democrats, lost his spot to Thomas M. Foglietta, a young lawyer and son of former councilman Michael Foglietta. Also losing bids for the Republican at-large seats were real estate assessor F. Raymond Heuges and former magistrate Hobson R. Reynolds.

At the district level, Democratic incumbents Thomas I. Guerin (district 1), Harry Norwitch (district 3), Samuel Rose (district 4), Raymond Pace Alexander (district 5), Michael J. Towey (district 6), James Hugh Joseph Tate (district 7), and Charles M. Finley (district 9) were all reelected. In the 2nd district, Democrat Gaetano Giordano took the seat from Republican David Zwanetz, who was nominated when incumbent Republican William M. Phillips did not run for reelection. In the 8th, the Republicans evened the score as state representative Wilbur H. Hamilton narrowly defeated Democratic incumbent Constance Dallas. Hamilton's brother, Robert S. Hamilton, had lost to Dallas four years earlier. In the final district council seat, the 10th, Democrat John M. McDevitt was elected to the seat previously held by Byrne. The Inquirer called the Democratic downballot victories "a rebuke to Republican leaders who sought to tie in the campaign with the 1956 Presidential election," and credited the Democrats with campaigning "on the theory that the issues were purely local."

Other offices and ballot measures
The Democrats' success continued in the down-ballot races. Democratic city commissioners Maurice S. Osser and Thomas P. McHenry were reelected as was Republican Walter I. Davidson. William M. Lennox was reelected county sheriff and Joseph A. Scanlon was reelected clerk of the court of quarter sessions (a court whose jurisdiction is now exercised by the court of common pleas). The Democrats also took four of the seven magisterial district judge positions up for election that year (a local court, the duties of which are now performed by the Philadelphia Municipal Court). The ballot contained two referendums authorizing the city to take loans for construction of medical facilities, streets, sewers, playgrounds, and other civic improvements. They passed with overwhelming support, each tallying 84% affirmative votes.

See also
List of members of Philadelphia City Council since 1952

References

Sources

Book

Newspapers

Philadelphia
Philadelphia 1955
Philadelphia
Mayoral elections in Philadelphia
1950s in Philadelphia
Philadelphia